Dorset Blue Vinney (frequently spelled "vinny") is a traditional blue cheese made near Sturminster Newton in Dorset, England, from cows' milk. It is a hard, crumbly cheese. It was formerly made of skimmed milk.

"Vinney" may be the Dorset form of the archaic word "vinny" 'moldy' or perhaps a corruption of "veiny", referring to its blue veins.

Historically the cheese was merely a by-product of the much more lucrative butter market. Milk was of little value before the railways as it could not be brought to market before it went off, thus cheese and butter production was the main focus of dairy farms. Dorset butter was highly regarded in London where it fetched a premium price but making butter left the farmers with large quantities of skimmed milk which they turned into a hard, crumbly cheese.

While the cheese was a common farmhouse cheese in Dorset for hundreds of years, production nearly dried up after the Second World War, and was made in very small quantities on just a few farms. However, in the 1980s Woodbridge Farm in Dorset revived the old recipe, and it is now producing the cheese again, but with whole milk.

In his poem "Praise O' Do'set", the Dorset poet William Barnes asks,

Woont ye have brown bread a-put ye,
An' some vinny cheese a-cut ye?

It is often made from unpasteurised milk. This is considered healthy by some and risky by others due to the potential for tuberculosis from infected cows passing into the milk. It has a strong taste and smell.

Blue Vinney goes well with Dorset knobs, another traditional product from Dorset.

Dorset Blue Cheese has been awarded Protected Geographical Status, ensuring only cheese originating from Dorset may use the name.

Local myth describes how in years gone by, due to its supposed illegal nature, Blue Vinny would be left on the doorstep of those who ordered it on the black market.

See also
 List of British cheeses

References

External links
 Cheese.com profile
 Dorset Blue Vinney

English cheeses
Cow's-milk cheeses
Blue cheeses
Blue Vinney